Steve Hawley may refer to:

 Steven Hawley (born 1951), NASA astronaut
 Steve Hawley (artist) (born 1952), British artist
 Stephen Hawley (born c. 1947), member of the New York State Assembly